The Harleston Sancroft Academy is a Church of England all-through school located in Harleston, Norfolk, England.  It was formed on 1 September 2022 from Archbishop Sancroft High School and Harleston Primary Academy.

History

The school was first established by Archbishop William Sancroft, who by deed on 25 June 1688 granted £54 a year to Emmanuel College, Cambridge to pay a clergyman to teach in Harleston. Sancroft had to gain permission from the monarch James II to found the school.

The school occupied its current premises in 1964.  Since then the school has continued to expand and has in recent years been over-subscribed, with students travelling some distance in Norfolk and Suffolk to be educated at the school.

In 2018, the school became the first secondary school as part of the Diocese of Norwich's St Benet’s Multi Academy Trust.

Description
When Ofsted visited the secondary school in 2013, prior to it becoming an academy, it found a good school. The school is smaller than the average-sized secondary school where a very large majority of the students are from White British backgrounds and all speak English as their first language. The proportion of disabled students and those with special educational needs was below the national average though the proportion of students receiving the pupil premium is similar to the national average.

Curriculum
The school operates a three-year, Key Stage 3 where all the core National Curriculum subjects are taught. Year 7 and Year 8 study core subjects: English, Mathematics, Science. The following foundation subjects are offered: French, German, Geography and History, Computing, Design & Technology, Drama, Life Skills, PSHE & RE,  Music,  Art and PE.

Every student in Key Stage 4  has the opportunity to study subjects that will give them the greatest possible range of choices in the future. All students will study the English language, English literature, Mathematics, Sciences, and Religious Education – a total of 6 GCSEs that make up the core. In addition to these courses, all students have PE lessons and RSHE - Relationships, Sex and Health Education which are not examined.

In addition to the 6 core qualifications, all students take either Geography, History, French, or Computer Science, and one extra option chosen from Geography, History, German, Computer Science, PE, Health & Fitness, Music, Food and Cookery, Engineering, Art and Design, Drama, or Enrichment. This makes 8 GCSEs, or 9 if the pupil is selected to do Triple Science.

See also
 William Sancroft - Archbishop of Canterbury

References

External links
Harleston Sancroft Academy official website
St Benet's MAT website
Diocese of Norwich Schools website

Secondary schools in Norfolk
Church of England secondary schools in the Diocese of Norwich
Educational institutions established in the 1680s
1688 establishments in England
Academies in Norfolk
Harleston, Norfolk
Primary schools in Norfolk